John Hunt (born 27 February 1935) is an Australian rower. He competed in the men's coxless pair event at the 1960 Summer Olympics.

References

1935 births
Living people
Australian male rowers
Olympic rowers of Australia
Rowers at the 1960 Summer Olympics
20th-century Australian people